Central Beijing Road is a major thoroughfare in the city of Lhasa, the capital of the Tibet Autonomous Region which links the city to north-east Tibet and China.

Roads in Tibet
Transport in Lhasa